Armorhydridae is a family of cnidarians belonging to the order Limnomedusae.

Genera:
 Armorhydra Swedmark & Teissier, 1958

References

Limnomedusae
Cnidarian families